Elysium Health is an American manufacturer of dietary supplements based in New York City.

History 
Elysium Health was founded in 2014 by biologist and director of the Glenn Center for Biology of Aging Research at MIT Leonard Guarente Ph.D., Dan Alminana, and Eric Marcotulli to develop health products based on advancements in scientific research market dietary supplements. 

In 2015, the company launched publicly and introduced its first product, Basis, which contains nicotinamide riboside and pterostilbene.  The company is widely described as being in the anti-aging field. Elysium is one of several companies founded at around the same time by people with backgrounds in the tech industry and Silicon Valley who saw opportunities in the health and biomedical industries, often focused on anti-aging.

In 2015, the company started selling Basis, a supplement designed to slow aging at the cellular level. In 2019, Elysium launched Index, a test that uses epigenetic analysis on saliva samples to calculate a biological age. 

In 2020, Elysium launched a new supplement called Matter, a B-vitamin complex, with bilberry and omega-3 fatty acids, intended to slow brain atrophy as one ages, based on a study called VITACOG done at the University of Oxford.

In October 2021, Elysium launched a supplement called Format, which is described as anti-aging and claims to support the immune system.

Criticism

The company has been criticized for using its advisory board to lend credibility to its product and for heavily marketing their product on social media.

Litigation 
Elysium originally bought the ingredients in Basis from ChromaDex, which as of December 2016, sold the two ingredients to other supplement companies that also marketed products containing them. The two companies had an agreement under which Elysium Health did not have to acknowledge ChromaDex as the source of the ingredients, but then after Elysium recruited the VP of business development from ChromaDex and reportedly stopped paying ChromaDex, ChromaDex sued Elysium and the information became public.

In September 2018, Dartmouth College and ChromaDex sued Elysium for infringing on patents for nicotinamide riboside. In August 2020, W.R. Grace and Company also sued Elysium for infringing on their patents for crystalline nicotinamide riboside. In September 2021, the claims by Dartmouth and ChromaDex were dismissed by a U.S. district judge, essentially invalidating their patents.

References

External links
 Official site

Nutritional supplement companies of the United States
Life sciences industry
Companies based in New York City
Companies established in 2014
2014 establishments in New York City